Luke Dahlhaus (born 21 August 1992) is a former Australian rules footballer who played for the Geelong Football Club and Western Bulldogs in the Australian Football League (AFL). He received a nomination for the 2011 AFL Rising Star award in round 21 of the 2011 season. Dahlhaus was a member of the Bulldogs team that won the premiership in 2016, the Bulldogs' first in 62 years.

Early career
Described as a "very strong and quick small forward who picks up possessions almost at will", as well as "a good stoppage player", Dahlhaus began playing football with his local team Leopold in the Geelong Football League. He was also selected to play for the Geelong Falcons in the TAC Cup youth competition, where he spent two seasons and played 27 games. In the 2010 TAC Cup, Dahlhaus averaged 21 disposals and six tackles per game, and was the leading tackler in the competition. He also represented Victoria Country at the under-18 national championships, and finished third in the Morrish Medal count with 18 votes. He was rewarded for his hard work by being named in the TAC Cup Team of the Year. Later in the year he broke the record for agility at the state screening.

AFL career

The Western Bulldogs selected Dahlhaus with their pick number 22 in the 2011 AFL Rookie Draft, and was assigned the guernsey number 40. He started the season playing for affiliate club Williamstown in the reserves side, but was soon promoted to the senior side, with coach Peter German noting his aggression and enthusiasm. 
After playing a handful of promising games for Williamstown, coupled with significant injury worries, the Bulldogs promoted Dahlhaus from the rookie list and named him as the substitute player in the match against St Kilda in Round 12 at Etihad Stadium. The Bulldogs lost the game, but Dahlhaus showed much promise in the limited game time he was given. He gathered nine disposals and showed some dash with his run-and-carry along the wings.
Better was to come in his next game against Adelaide. The Dogs broke a four-game losing streak - winning by 30 points - and Dahlhaus was recognized as one of the best Bulldogs players. He recorded 18 disposals with six inside-50s, laid four tackles and kicked his first career goal in the last quarter to seal the victory.

In round 21 Dahlhaus earned a nomination for the 2011 AFL Rising Star.
Dahlhaus had a mostly inconsistent season throughout 2013 but played one of his best games in his career in Round 18 against West Coast at Etihad Stadium which he kicked 4 goals and picked up 29 disposals, the dogs won the game.

In September Dahlhaus shaved off his iconic dreadlocks live on Before The Game for the Whitten Foundation and the Good Friday Appeal. By the time his dreadlocks where shaved by teammate Liam Jones, he had raised A$13,035 for the charities.

In November it was announced that Dahlhaus had agreed to a contract extension with the Bulldogs and had also been upgraded to the senior list.
During 2015, he had a strong, consistent season and was one of the favourites for the Best and Fairest which was won by Easton Wood.

In 2016, Dalhaus won the Rose–Sutton Medal in the match against Collingwood.

At the end of the 2018 season, Dahlhaus signed as an unrestricted free agent with the Geelong Cats.

Statistics
Statistics are correct to the end of the 2020 season

|- style="background:#EAEAEA"
| scope="row" text-align:center | 2011
| 
| 40 || 11 || 11 || 7 || 76 || 79 || 155 || 23 || 46 || 1.0 || 0.6 || 6.9 || 7.2 || 14.1 || 2.1 || 4.2 || 1
|-
| scope="row" text-align:center | 2012
| 
| 40 || 17 || 13 || 18 || 174 || 124 || 298 || 45 || 67 || 0.8 || 1.1 || 10.2 || 7.3 || 17.5 || 2.6 || 3.9 || 4
|- style="background:#EAEAEA"
| scope="row" text-align:center | 2013
| 
| 6 || 22 || 28 || 18 || 177 || 192 || 369 || 37 || 90 || 1.3 || 0.8 || 8.0 || 8.7 || 16.8 || 1.7 || 4.1 || 7
|-
| scope="row" text-align:center | 2014
| 
| 6 || 21 || 17 || 23 || 239 || 214 || 453 || 71 || 87 || 0.8 || 1.1 || 11.4 || 10.2 || 21.6 || 3.4 || 4.1 || 3
|- style="background:#EAEAEA"
| scope="row" text-align:center | 2015
| 
| 6 || 23 || 17 || 10 || 276 || 314 || 590 || 77 || 120 || 0.7 || 0.4 || 12.0 || 13.7 || 25.7 || 3.3 || 5.2 || 7
|-
| scope=row bgcolor=F0E68C | 2016# 
| 
| 6 || 21 || 9 || 8 || 228 || 318 || 546 || 67 || 113 || 0.4 || 0.4 || 10.9 || 15.1 || 26.0 || 3.2 || 5.4 || 7
|- style="background:#EAEAEA"
| scope="row" text-align:center | 2017
| 
| 6 || 22 || 13 || 6 || 199 || 352 || 551 || 74 || 93 || 0.6 || 0.3 || 9.0 || 16.0 || 25.0 || 3.4 || 4.2 || 6
|-
| scope="row" text-align:center | 2018
| 
| 6 || 17 || 2 || 4 || 127 || 238 || 365 || 67 || 72 || 0.1 || 0.2 || 7.5 || 14.0 || 21.5 || 3.9 || 4.2 || 0
|- style="background:#EAEAEA"
| scope="row" text-align:center | 2019
| 
| 40 || 24 || 14 || 16 || 171 || 262 || 433 || 71 || 115 || 0.6 || 0.7 || 7.1 || 10.9 || 18.0 || 3.0 || 4.8 || 0
|-
| scope="row" text-align:center | 2020
| 
| 40 || 16 || 7 || 0 || 89 || 127 || 216 || 44 || 37 || 0.4 || 0.0 || 5.6 || 7.9 || 13.5 || 2.8 || 2.3 || 0
|- style="background:#EAEAEA; font-weight:bold; width:2em"
| scope="row" text-align:center class="sortbottom" colspan=3 | Career
| 194
| 131
| 110
| 1756
| 2220
| 3976
| 576
| 840
| 0.7
| 0.6
| 9.1
| 11.4
| 20.5
| 3.0
| 4.3
| 35
|}

Notes

Honours and achievements
Team
 AFL premiership player: 2016

Individual
 AFL Rising Star nominee: 2011

References

External links 

 
 

Western Bulldogs players
Western Bulldogs Premiership players
Geelong Football Club players
1992 births
Living people
Australian rules footballers from Victoria (Australia)
Geelong Falcons players
Williamstown Football Club players
Leopold Football Club (Geelong) players
Australian people of Dutch descent
Place of birth missing (living people)
One-time VFL/AFL Premiership players